Sherin Francis (born March 30, 1984) is a Seychellois economist and finance expert. She is the Principal Secretary for the Tourism Department, which is under the purview of the Ministry for Foreign Affairs and Tourism. Prior to her appointment as the head of the Tourism Department in April 2021, She was the chief executive officer of the Seychelles Tourism Board, for eight years. Under her leadership, tourism has increased with specific campaigns targeting markets such as the United Kingdom.

Early life and education
Sherin Francis born Naiken grew up in the Anse Royale administrative district of Mahé, Seychelles, where she completed her early education. She holds a B.Sc degree in Economics and Business Studies from the University of Manchester, U.K; and an M.Sc degree in Finance from the University of London.

Career
She started her career in 2006 at the Ministry of National Development as an industrial officer before she rose through the ranks to become director of investment promotion. In July 2013, she was appointed CEO of the Seychelles Tourism Board, succeeding Elsia Grandcourt.

In 2015, she remained upbeat about the tourism prospect of the islands, attributing the economic reforms of the government for the increase of visitors early in the year, particularly from the UK and France. She also linked this with a marketing drive executed under her leadership of the tourism board, with the campaign "luxury within reach" targeting potential visitors in the UK. To further promote this work, she appeared in interviews with the BBC, The Daily Telegraph and CNN.

Personal life
She is married to Marco Francis, a businessman and former chairman of the Seychelles Chamber of Commerce and Industry. Together, they have two children.

References

1984 births
Living people
People from Anse Royale
Seychellois women in business
Seychellois economists
Seychellois businesspeople
Alumni of the University of Manchester
Alumni of University of London Worldwide
Alumni of the University of London